Francesco Maria Preti (1701-1774) was an Italian architect of the late-Baroque period. He was born in Castelfranco Veneto near Treviso. He trained in the University of Brescia, and returned to rebuild Santa Maria Assunta e San Liberale, the cathedral of Castelfranco. A posthumous treatise on the Elements of Architecture was printed in Venice in 1780. He also designed a theater in Castelfranco. He designed a number of parochial churches nearby in Valla, Salvatronda, Caselle, and Tombolo.

References

1701 births
1774 deaths
18th-century Italian architects
Italian Baroque architects
Architects from Veneto
Italian architecture writers